The Sinuiju North Korean Leader's Residence, which may locally be known as the Central Luxury House or Central Luxury Residence, is one of the many official residences of North Korean leader and Workers' Party of Korea's general secretary Kim Jong-Un.  He reportedly took over the residence from his father, Kim Jong-il  after the elder Kim's death in 2011.  The residence is located near Sinuiju, in the North P'yŏngan province of North Korea.  Public knowledge about the residence came to light through the North Korea Uncovered project.

See also
 North Korean leader's residences
 Official residence
 Ryongsong Residence

References

Government buildings in North Korea
Sinuiju
Official residences
Residential buildings in North Korea
Buildings and structures in North Pyongan Province